Frostenden is a village and civil parish in the East Suffolk district of the English county of Suffolk. The parish church, All Saints, is one of 38 existing round-tower churches in Suffolk.

In 1870, Frostenden was described by John Marius Wilson in the "Imperial Gazetteer of England and Wales":The property is divided among a few. The living is a rectory in the diocese of Norwich. Value, £348. Patron, Thomas Barne, Esq. The church is chiefly early English; has a round western tower; and contains an early English piscina and a later English font. Charities, £28.Frostenden was previously part of the Blything Hundred district, a form of county division used up until the end of the 19th century. Blything was the largest of the 21 Suffolk hundreds, and was composed of 48 parishes.

Population 
In 1881, the population was reported as 386 but in 2011 the Frostenden population had decreased to 167. The highest population recorded was in the 1851 census with a total of 456 people.

All Saints' Church 
A key feature of Frostenden is the Round-tower church, which is now a Grade I listed building. The tower is one of the oldest in Suffolk and dates back to either the Norman or Saxon era. The church however dates back to the 13th century. Above the southern door to the church sits a distinctive and bright sundial, thought to be from the 18th century, reading "vigilate et orate" meaning "Watch and Pray" in Latin. The stained glass windows of the church are much newer, dating back to the early 20th century.

The village had previously been a medieval fort, and the former river bed sits just behind the church; at the time of the Domesday Book of 1086 being compiled, the village had a considerable population and two churches.

The number "1606" is scratched into one of the church walls, which could be reference to when the Dutch navigator, Willem Janszoon, reached the shores of Australia for the first time.

Memorials 
There are several memorials on the site of the church, for both the First World War and the Second World War. Unusually for the area, the parish lost more men during the Second World War, which is uncommon for rural areas as it might indicate that the population was higher during this time.

Domesday entry 
The parish of Frostenden appeared within the Domesday Book in 1086. The entry listed:

Thorth [son of Ulfkil] [held] FROSTENDEN as a manor; 3 carucates of land before 1066. Always [in both 1066 and 1086] 10 villagers. Then [1066] 14 smallholders, now [1086] 20; then 2 slaves. Always 2 ploughs in lordship. Always 1 seaport. Then and later 9 men's ploughs, now 7. Woodland, 40 pigs; then 1 salt-house, now none; meadow, 3 acres. Then 2 cobs, now 1; then 10 cattle, now 6; then 60 pigs, now 13; 60 sheep, 24 goats, 2 beehives. Value always £4. The King and the Earl [have] the 6 forfeitures. 
In the same [Frostenden] 8 free men before 1066, now 3; 113 acres. Then 3 ploughs, now 1. Meadow, 1/2 acre. Value then 10s; now 14[shillings]. [This is] by exchange. The King and the Earl [have] the jurisdiction. It has 1 league and 24 perches in length, and 10 furlongs and 7 perches in width; 4d in tax. Ranulf holds [this]. 2 churches, 28 acres. 1 plough. Value 3s.In contrast to modern times, however, the area was described as a sea port, indicating that the now dried-up river bed behind the church was once navigable and of a considerable size compared with today. The population of Frostenden in 1086 was listed as 33 households, or approximately 165 people.

During this time, it has also been suggested that the area had a thriving fishing industry, due to the sea port. There is evidence to suggest that the fishermen would travel down the river to the sea to catch herring along the coast; herring fishing had been a key aspect to the Anglo-Saxon economy. This also explains the presence of a salt house, as listed in the Domesday Book as an asset of the parish, as large amounts of salt would be needed to preserve the herrings they caught. It has also been suggested that there would have been a dock or quay on the river in Frostenden to allow easy access for the fishing trade.

Mound 

There is a historically significant mound typically described as in Frostenden and associated with the above-mentioned sea port, but actually across the parish boundary in South Cove. It is approximately equidistant between Frostenden Corner and Cove Bottom. It is a suspected Viking fortification, the only one in Suffolk.

It was first suggested as a Viking fortification by Claude Morley in 1924, after finding a site on the nearby river bank that he suspected to be the Domesday port. Ernest Cooper, writing with Morley, stated that the fort was built to protect the port, which included a dock in which the Vikings would lay up ships for the winter, though also said it may be a ship burial.

The site was the excavated by Peter Woodard in January to February 1951. It was surveyed again by Charles W. Phillips, working as an archaeological officer for ordinance survey in 1954, who stated that it was unlikely to be a ship burial as these were constructed on the highest available land near the water, and the mound is within a slight valley. He added that while it was not impossible for it to be a fortification, "it is very oddly sited in relation to the surrounding ground", again because of the valley. Woodard described the suggested dock as "not impossible but very difficult to prove."

The site was surveyed again on the 11th of January 1972. The surveyor stated that "its position rules out the possibility of it being a round barrow, motte, or windmill mound" and that the suggested dock "is a line of natural slopes".

The river was dredged around 1978.

Gatehouse Gazetteer opined that statements dismissing the possibility of it being a fortification were probably overstated and "based on false ideas about the function of castles." It describes it as "a ditched mound, with a palisade and clearly used in C11."

The site may also have been excavated by Eustace Grubb.

References

External links

 Website with photos of Frostenden All Saints, a round-tower church

Villages in Suffolk
Civil parishes in Suffolk